

History 

The Museum of Fine Arts (MFA) was founded by art collector and philanthropist Margaret Acheson Stuart (1896–1980). The Margaret Acheson Stuart Society, the Museum's independent support organization, is named in her honor.

The city provided the four-acre waterfront site for the construction of the original building and The Junior League of St. Petersburg offered resources for The Great Hall. The building was designed by John Volk and Associates of Palm Beach, with a curving colonnade on Beach Drive. Volk stated that "a museum should give a feeling of permanence and that is what I have tried to do with this building." Chartered by the State of Florida in 1961, the MFA opened its Beach Drive doors to the public in 1965; the first art museum in St. Petersburg. 

The expansion broke ground on Monday, December 4, 2006 and more than doubled the size of the museum. The new 33,000 square-foot Hazel Hough wing, located on the north side of the building, was finished in 2008. The expansion included a new café, an enlarged library and a bigger museum shop, all since removed.

Today, the museum offers programs for adults and families. For adults, the MFA offers recurring monthly programs and special lectures, gallery talks, cinema screenings, and music concerts. Families can also participate in monthly programs such as Kidding Around Yoga and annual events such as Painting in the Park. On June 23, a Bahamian artist, Gio Swaby, celebrated Black women at Museum of Fine Arts.

The museum's extensive holdings span over 5,000 years of human history and feature works from renowned artists such as Monet, Gauguin, Renoir, and Cézanne, as well as significant works of art from Asia, Africa, and the Americas.

With its impressive collection and commitment to fostering an appreciation for the arts, the Museum of Fine Arts is a beloved cultural landmark that draws visitors from around the world.

Collection 

The museum's exhibitions have displayed Chihuly Across Florida: Masterworks in Glass (2004); Monet’s London, Artists’ Reflections on the Thames, 1859–1914 (2005), and Ancient Egypt: Art and Magic, Treasures from the Fondation Gandur Pour l’Art/Geneva (2011–2012), Moon Museum: Art and Outer Space (2018), Syd Solomon: Views From Above (2018-2019), and Art of the Stage: Picasso to Hockney (2020).

References

External links

 

Art museums established in 1965
Art museums and galleries in Florida
Museums in St. Petersburg, Florida
1965 establishments in Florida